"Wine, Beer, Whiskey" is a song recorded by American country music group Little Big Town from their ninth studio album, Nightfall (2020). It was released to country radio as the album's third single on June 1, 2020. The music video premiered on November 7, 2020.

The song was written by the four members of Little Big Town — Karen Fairchild, Kimberly Schlapman, Phillip Sweet and Jimi Westbrook — alongside Tofer Brown and Sean McConnell, and produced by the band.

Critical reception
In his review of Nightfall, Billy Dukes with Taste of Country called the song "the perfect interruption" and one of the album's best single choices, comparing it to their own song "Pontoon", but maintaining that it still felt fresh. Maura Johnson of Entertainment Weekly called it "a raucous, horn-assisted party, the four members saluting bar fixtures like 'Jack' and 'Tito' the way old friends might as last call hits."

Live performances 
Little Big Town performed the song on live TV for the first time on June 1, 2020 on the Tonight Show with Jimmy Fallon. The band also performed it on the CMT Music Awards on October 21, 2020 as the show's closing performance.

Commercial performance
"Wine, Beer, Whiskey" debuted at number 59 on the Billboard Country Airplay chart dated July 25, 2020. It also debuted at number 100 on the Billboard Hot 100, becoming the group's first single to reach the chart since 2016's "Better Man".

Charts

Weekly charts

Year-end charts

Certifications

References

2020 singles
2020 songs
Little Big Town songs
Songs written by Karen Fairchild
Songs written by Sean McConnell
Songs written by Kimberly Schlapman
Songs written by Phillip Sweet
Songs written by Jimi Westbrook
Capitol Records Nashville singles